The Omisore family is a noble Yoruba family originating from Ife, Nigeria. The Omisore family was founded by the aristocratic chief of Ife, Lowa Ajani Anibijuwon Omisore.

Etymology
The surname is a reference to the Yoruba river goddess, Oshun. It is a contraction of the Yoruba phrase "omi-ṣe-mí-lore", meaning "water has done good things for me". The surname has also been translated to "water has done good deeds" or "water has done us favour".

People
Iyiola Omisore – Nigerian engineer, businessman, politician, and former senator of Osun State
Ajani Anibijuwon Omisore – Chief and Lowa of Ife
Dot da Genius (Oladipo Omishore) – music producer, audio engineer, and electrical engineer
Yoruba-language surnames

References